The Boinae are a purported subfamily of boas found in Central and South America, as well as the West Indies. In the Integrated Taxonomic Information System (ITIS), Boinae is considered an invalid synonym of Boidae.

Genera

) Not including the nominate subspecies.
T) Type genus.

Taxonomy
The genera Acrantophis and Sanzinia were erroneously synonymized with the genus Boa by Kluge in 1991. These have now been transferred to the resurrected subfamily Sanziniinae. The genus Candoia has similarly been transferred to its own subfamily, Candoiinae.

See also
 List of boine species and subspecies

References

Further reading

 Kluge AG. 1991. Boine Snake Phylogeny and Research Cycles. Misc. Pub. Museum of Zoology, Univ. of Michigan No. 178. PDF at University of Michigan Library. Accessed 8 July 2008.

External links

 Boinae at ZipcodeZoo.com. Accessed 14 July 2008.
 

 
Extant Paleocene first appearances
Snake subfamilies
Taxa named by John Edward Gray